Philipp Lienhart (born 11 July 1996) is an Austrian professional footballer who plays as a centre back for Bundesliga club SC Freiburg  and the Austria national team.

Club career

Rapid Wien
Born in Lilienfeld, Lower Austria, Lienhart joined SK Rapid Wien's youth setup in 2008, aged 12. He made his senior debut for their reserve team on 16 April 2013, coming on as a late substitute in a 3–3 away draw against FC Admira Wacker Mödling Amateure for the Regionalliga championship.

Real Madrid
In August 2014, after being regularly used, Lienhart was loaned to Real Madrid. He competed with their youth team in the season's UEFA Youth League, playing seven matches and scoring in a 3–2 loss away to Liverpool in the group stage on 22 October, and also appeared with the C-side in Tercera División.

At the end of his first season, Lienhart was signed permanently for €800,000, and was subsequently promoted to the reserves by manager Zinedine Zidane. He made his debut for the B-team on 30 August 2015, playing the full 90 minutes of a 2–1 win at CF Rayo Majadahonda.

On 3 October 2015, Lienhart scored his first Castilla goal, equalising for a 1–1 draw at Sestao River Club by heading in Martin Ødegaard's corner kick. Two weeks later, amid an injury crisis, he was included in the main squad for the first time by manager Rafael Benítez, for a La Liga match against Levante UD; he was unused in the 3–0 win at the Santiago Bernabéu Stadium. He made his first team debut on 2 December 2015, replacing James Rodríguez in a 3–1 Copa del Rey away win against Cádiz CF.

SC Freiburg
On 5 July 2017, Lienhart was loaned to SC Freiburg for one year. In June 2018, the club announced they had signed him permanently from Real Madrid. The transfer fee was estimated at €2 million plus bonuses.

International career
Lienhart represented Austria at the under-18, under-19, under-20 and under-21 levels.

Lienhart got his first call up to the senior Austria side after Sebastian Prödl withdrew through injury for 2018 FIFA World Cup qualifiers against Wales and Georgia in September 2017. He made his debut playing the full 90 minutes of the final match of the qualifying campaign, a 1–0 win against Moldova in October.

Career statistics

Club

International

References

External links

1996 births
Living people
People from Lilienfeld
Austrian footballers
Association football defenders
Austrian Regionalliga players
Segunda División B players
Tercera División players
Bundesliga players
SK Rapid Wien players
Real Madrid C footballers
Real Madrid Castilla footballers
Real Madrid CF players
SC Freiburg players
Austria youth international footballers
Austria under-21 international footballers
Austria international footballers
UEFA Euro 2020 players
Austrian expatriate footballers
Austrian expatriate sportspeople in Germany
Austrian expatriate sportspeople in Spain
Expatriate footballers in Germany
Expatriate footballers in Spain
Footballers from Lower Austria